Atthawit Sukchuai (born March 13, 1996) is a Thai professional footballer who plays as an attacking midfielder.

Honours

International
Thailand U-17
 AFF U-16 Youth Championship: 2011

International career

He won the 2011 AFF U-16 Youth Championship with Thailand U17.

References

External links
 Profile at Goal

1996 births
Living people
Atthawit Sukchuai
Atthawit Sukchuai
Association football midfielders
Atthawit Sukchuai
Atthawit Sukchuai
Atthawit Sukchuai
Atthawit Sukchuai
Atthawit Sukchuai
Atthawit Sukchuai
Aspire Academy (Qatar) players